James or Jim Peterson may refer to:
Jim Peterson (born 1941), Canadian politician
Jim Peterson (Montana politician) (born 1946), Montana state senator
Jim Peterson (baseball) (1908–1975), American baseball player
James Peterson (writer), American writer and teacher
J. Hardin Peterson (1894–1978), U.S. Representative from Florida
James D. Peterson (born 1957), U.S. District Judge for the Western District of Wisconsin
James D. H. Peterson (1894–?), Wisconsin State Assemblyman
Jim Peterson (South Dakota politician) (born 1943), South Dakota state senator
James Peterson (figure skater), American figure skater
Jim Peterson (American football) (born 1950), American football player
James F. Peterson, member of the South Carolina House of Representatives

See also
Tyler James Peterson, perpetrator of the 2007 Crandon, Wisconsin shooting
Jim Petersen (born 1962), American basketball player and sportscaster